The National WWII Museum, formerly known as The National D-Day Museum, is a military history museum located in the Central Business District of New Orleans, Louisiana, U.S., on Andrew Higgins Drive between Camp Street and Magazine Street. The museum focuses on the contribution made by the United States to Allied victory in World War II. Founded in 2000, it was later designated by the U.S. Congress as America's official National WWII Museum in 2004. The museum is a Smithsonian Institution affiliated museum, as part of the Smithsonian Institution's outreach program. The mission statement of the museum emphasizes the American experience in World War II.

History
The museum opened as the D-Day Museum, on June 6, 2000, the 56th anniversary of D-Day, focusing on the amphibious invasion of Normandy.  As the Higgins boats, vital to amphibious operations, were designed, built, and tested in New Orleans by Higgins Industries, the city was the natural home for such a project. Furthermore, New Orleans was the home of historian and author Stephen Ambrose, who spearheaded the effort to build the museum.  Ambrose also wrote a book entitled D-Day in 1994, which describes the planning and execution of Operation Neptune, which was launched on June 6, 1944. The early emphasis of the museum on D-Day, the location of Higgins Industries, and Ambrose's connections to New Orleans were all factors in the museum being established in New Orleans.

Museum description
In addition to opening a second gallery exploring the amphibious invasions of the Pacific War in the original building, known as the Louisiana Memorial Pavilion, the museum has since opened the Solomon Victory Theater, the John E. Kushner Restoration Pavilion, the US Freedom Pavilion: The Boeing Center, and the Campaigns of Courage pavilion. As of February 2022, the Liberation Pavilion is in construction.

Within the large atrium of the Louisiana Memorial Pavilion several aircraft are on display, including a Supermarine Spitfire and a Douglas C-47 Skytrain suspended from the ceiling. A LCVP, or "Higgins boat," is also usually on display in this pavilion. The exhibits in this pavilion focus on the amphibious landings in the European theater of the war and on the contributions of the home front. The Louisiana Memorial Pavilion is also home to rotating temporary exhibits, as well as the immersive and interactive train car (part of the larger "Dog Tag Experience" interactive), which opened in 2013.

This part of the museum includes several permanent galleries, including the Home Front, Planning for D-Day, and the D-Day Beaches. The third floor of the Louisiana Memorial Pavilion includes an observation deck for closer viewing of the hanging aircraft.

In January 2013, the museum opened the US Freedom Pavilion: The Boeing Center, which is the now largest building on the campus. The collection in the US Freedom Pavilion includes a B-17E Flying Fortress bomber, a B-25J Mitchell bomber, an SBD-3 Dauntless, a TBF Avenger, a P-51D Mustang, Corsair F4U-4 and an interactive submarine experience based on the final mission of the USS Tang. The B-17E is the airplane dubbed My Gal Sal, famous for having been lost over Greenland and recovered 53 years later. The US Freedom Pavilion was paid for with a $15 million donation from the Boeing Company and with a $20 million grant from the US Department of Defense with congressional approval.

In December 2014, the museum opened the Road to Berlin portion of the Campaigns of Courage pavilion, focusing on the European theater of war. A Messerschmitt Bf 109 hangs in the building. The Road to Tokyo portion of this same pavilion, which focuses on the Pacific war, opened in 2015. The entire pavilion, including both galleries, measures 32,000 square feet.

In June 2017, a new exhibit, The Arsenal of Democracy, opened in the Louisiana Memorial Pavilion, dealing the experience on the Home Front.

The museum also has plans to open what will be called the Liberation Pavilion by 2020 with assistance from the Monuments Men Foundation for the Preservation of Art. Its goal would be to explore the "joys, costs, and meaning of liberation and freedom," as well as how the legacy of World War II affects us today. The museum part of the Monuments Men and Women Museum Network, launched in 2021 by the Monuments Men Foundation for the Preservation of Art.

Visitors to the museum are encouraged to allocate roughly 2½ to 3 hours to tour the museum. An award-winning 4-D film, Beyond All Boundaries, is shown in the Solomon Victory Theater and gives the visitor an overview of the war on every front. Other multimedia displays are integrated into most of the museum's exhibits, notably the dozens of video oral histories conducted with veterans of the war by museum staff. The museum currently houses two restaurants, the American Sector Restaurant & Bar and the Soda Shop.

The museum sponsors a wargaming club and holds a wargame convention each year called "Heat of Battle". The museum hosts an annual robotics challenge where teams compete using the Lego Mindstorms components. The museum also hosts a World War II-themed quiz bowl tournament, which is televised on Cox 4 New Orleans.

Relation to New Orleans

The museum closed for three months after Hurricane Katrina ravaged New Orleans on August 29, 2005, re-opening on December 3 of that year. A museum banner promoted the re-opening by proclaiming "We Have Returned," a phrase made famous by General Douglas MacArthur regarding his eventual return to the Philippines in 1944.

As of 2015, the museum is in the midst of a $400 million capital expansion campaign called The Road to Victory: A Vision for Future Generations. The expansion has resulted in significant increases in attendance. The Solomon Victory Theater, Stage Door Canteen, and American Sector restaurant opened in November 2009. The John E. Kushner Restoration Pavilion opened in June 2011. The US Freedom Pavilion: The Boeing Center opened to the public in 2013, followed by the opening of the first phase of the Campaigns of Courage pavilion in 2014. The second phase of the Campaigns of Courage Pavilion, Road to Tokyo, opened in 2015. The final project in the expansion will be the Liberation Pavilion. Initially, the intended date of completion of the expansion project was 2015, but has since been pushed back due to a series of delays causing it to be set to finish in 2022.

Visitation at the museum continues to grow, with 406,251 in 2010 having grown to nearly 700,000 in fiscal year 2016.

The museum helps the economy of Louisiana substantially with a total of about $132 million annually. The museum also is one of New Orleans' biggest employers. It directly supports 300 jobs and indirectly supports another 142 jobs.

Gallery

Airplanes

See also
 American Heritage Museum -  Stow, Massachusetts
 Imperial War Museum - London, England
 The International Museum of World War II -  Natick, Massachusetts (closed in September 2019)
 Marine Corps War Memorial - Arlington County, Virginia
 Museum of La Coupole - German-built V-2 launch site in Pas-de-Calais, France
 Museum of the War of Chinese People's Resistance Against Japanese Aggression - Beijing, China
 Museum of the Great Patriotic War, Moscow - Poklonnaya Gora, Moscow, Russia
 Museum of the Second World War - Gdańsk, Poland
 National D-Day Memorial - Bedford, Virginia
 National Museum of the History of Ukraine in the Second World War - Kiev, Ukraine
 National Museum of the Pacific War - in home of Fleet Admiral Chester Nimitz in Fredericksburg, Texas
 National World War I Museum and Memorial -  Kansas City, Missouri
 United States Holocaust Memorial Museum - National Mall, Washington, DC
 World War II Memorial -  National Mall, Washington, DC

References

External links

 
 New Orleans Museums

Museums established in 2000
Museums in New Orleans
Military and war museums in Louisiana
World War II museums in the United States
2000 establishments in Louisiana
World War II Museum
World War II Museum
World War II Museum